Ayam pansuh or manuk pansuh is a dish prepared by cooking chicken meat in a bamboo stalk, filled with water (which will later be the soup), seasonings and covered with tapioca leaves from the cassava plant (later can be eaten together with the cooked chicken). The origin of ayam pansuh is unknown, but the Ibans and the Bidayuhs from western Borneo always prepare this dish during festivals, especially during the Gawai Dayak (a thanksgiving festival marking a bountiful harvest). Ayam pansuh is typical among the people in Sarawak, Malaysia and also in West Kalimantan, Indonesia. There is a plan to introduce the dish into the international market.

See also

 List of stuffed dishes

References

Indonesian chicken dishes
Malaysian chicken dishes
Malay cuisine
Stuffed dishes